David Aliu (born 13 March 1981) is a British retired professional basketball player. He last played for Cheshire Phoenix in the British Basketball League. Aliu was part of the Mersey Tigers' treble-winning 2010/11 team, and in November 2011, became the Tigers' record points scorer in the BBL.

Early life and career
Born in Liverpool, England, Aliu started playing basketball at the age of 14 in his home town of Liverpool, playing for local side Toxteth Tigers. He landed a scholarship in the US, playing at the Notre Dame Academy in Virginia, before moving on to and graduating from Morehead State University, Kentucky in 2004.

Professional career
The power forward made his British Basketball League debut on 01/10/2004 playing for Scottish Rocks against Newcastle Eagles, and he went on to make 11 appearances for the Rocks, averaging 6.27 PPG.

He then moved on to play for three teams in the Icelandic Úrvalsdeild karla - Tindastóll (15.7 ppg and 5.0 rpg), Hamar/Selfoss (20.7 ppg and 8.9 rpg) and Þór Þorlákshöfn (23.6 ppg and 9.5 rpg) - from 2005 to 2007, with a short spell at Leicester Riders in the BBL in the middle.

After a brief spell with Celso Míguez Procolor in Spain, Aliu returned to his home city to play for the new professional franchise, Everton Tigers.

He averaged 15.8 points per game in 33 appearances for the Tigers, before leaving to play for BBC Lausanne in Switzerland. He took a year out of the sport following the birth of his daughter, but returned to the re-branded Mersey Tigers for the 2010/11 season. Aliu won the BBL Championship, BBL Trophy and BBL play-off titles, playing alongside Great Britain players Andrew Sullivan and Nate Reinking, in a very successful season.

In August 2011, Aliu signed a new two-year deal with the Tigers to keep him at the club until the end of the 2012/13 season.

In September 2012, Aliu signed with a contract with the Manchester Giants.

In June 2014, Aliu signed a two-year contract with the Cheshire Phoenix. On 20 July 2016 Aliu retired from basketball.

Other Notes 
Aliu was the first person to score a basket at the ECHO Arena in Liverpool.

References

External links 
 
 David Aliu Column on BBL Fans
 Úrvalsdeild statistics at Icelandic Basketball Association
 College statistics at Sports Reference

1981 births
Living people
Cheshire Phoenix players
English men's basketball players
Hamar men's basketball players
Leicester Riders players
Manchester Giants players
Mersey Tigers players
Minnesota State–Moorhead Dragons men's basketball players
Power forwards (basketball)
Sportspeople from Liverpool
Ungmennafélagið Tindastóll men's basketball players
Úrvalsdeild karla (basketball) players
Þór Þorlákshöfn (basketball club) players
British expatriate basketball people in the United States
British expatriate basketball people in Iceland
Black British sportsmen
British expatriate basketball people in Spain
British expatriate basketball people in Switzerland
English expatriate sportspeople in the United States
English expatriate sportspeople in Switzerland
English expatriate sportspeople in Spain
English expatriate sportspeople in Iceland